Jurek may refer to:

 Jurek (given name)
 Jurek (surname)
 a nom de guerre of Izrael Chaim Wilner (1917–1943), Jewish resistance fighter in World War II Poland
 nom de guerre of Jerzy Zborowski (1922–1944), World War II Polish resistance fighter

See also
 Jerzy